Khamsin is a hot spring wind in the Middle East. It may also refer to:

Khamsin, a socialist magazine published between 1975 and 1989
Khamsin, a character in Metal Gear Rising: Revengeance
Khamsin Nbh'w (Flame Haze), a character in Shakugan no Shana
Khamsin Pass, and Antarctic pass running north–south between Relay Hills and the Kinnear Mountains
Eremiaphila khamsin, a species of praying mantis native to Egypt and Yemen
Maserati Khamsin, a sports car